The Kermadec petrel (Pterodroma neglecta) is a species of gadfly petrel in the family Procellariidae. It is 38 cm long with a wingspan of 100 cm. It is polymorphic, with light, dark and intermediate morphs known. It eats squid, fish and other marine creatures.

Distribution
It breeds in the Pacific ocean from Lord Howe Island to the Juan Fernández Islands. Rarely is the Kermadec petrel recorded west of Lord Howe Island, where it maintains a small colony of less than 100 individuals on Balls Pyramid. In the past it also bred in some numbers on the main islands, however, this is seen as unlikely today. Not much is known of the bird's breeding pattern at Balls Pyramid, however, it usually nests there in late summer. This coincides with the breeding patterns of other birds in the Kermadec Islands. The larger of its two subspecies, P. n. juana, also breeds on Round Island, off Mauritius, where it may sometimes hybridise with the Trindade petrel. The species is a vagrant in Hawaii, Australia and New Zealand. Reported vagrants in Pennsylvania and North Carolina in the United States and also in the United Kingdom are thought to be dubious.

Breeding

This species is monogamous and raises a single chick each year, which becomes independent after 100–130 days. The Kermadec petrel is unusual for its wide range of breeding times, with different colonies nesting from October to February or from February to March.

References

External links
BirdLife species factsheet

Kermadec petrel
Birds of the Kermadec Islands
Birds of Lord Howe Island
Kermadec petrel
Taxonomy articles created by Polbot